Ignacio Flores Ferrando (born July 31, 1990 in Montevideo), commonly known as Ignacio Flores, is a Uruguayan footballer who plays as a striker for CA Rentistas.

References

External links
 Profile at soccerway
 Profile at footballdatabase
 Ignacio Flores at Ceroacero

1990 births
Living people
Footballers from Montevideo
Association football forwards
Uruguayan footballers
Club Atlético River Plate (Montevideo) players
C.A. Rentistas players
Uruguayan expatriate footballers
Expatriate footballers in Spain
RCD Mallorca B players